is a Japanese voice actor affiliated with Super Eccentric Theater. Yano graduated from Hosei University and debuted as an actor in 2012, in a stage role with Super Eccentric Theater. He debuted as a voice actor in 2014, as the voice of Shingo Sawatari in the anime series Yu-Gi-Oh! Arc-V.

Filmography

Anime
2014
Yu-Gi-Oh! Arc-V as Shingo Sawatari

2016
B-Project: Kodō*Ambitious as Engineer

2017
Digimon Universe: App Monsters as Student
The Idolmaster SideM as Nao Okamura
Blood Blockade Battlefront & Beyond as Seller

2018
The Seven Deadly Sins: Revival of the Commandments as Puora, Ende, Soracid
Boarding School Juliet as Student, Referee
The Idolmaster SideM: Wake Atte Mini! as Nao Okamura
Tsurune as Nanao Kisaragi

2019
Mob Psycho 100 II as Udo
Given as Mafuyu Satō

2020
number24 as Takumi Hidaka

2021
Pretty Boy Detective Club as Hyota Ashikaga
Visual Prison as Jack Mouton

2022
Fanfare of Adolescence as Yu Arimura
3-byo Ato, Yajū.: Gōkon de Suma ni Ita Kare wa Midara na Nikushoku Deshita as Kaname Tōjō (on-air version)

Films
2020
Given as Mafuyu Satō
2022
Tsurune as Nanao Kisaragi

Video games
2016
The Idolmaster SideM as Nao Okamura

2017
Star Revolution☆88 Seiza no Idol Kakumei as Jun Kujira
Hiragana Danshi Itsura no Kowe as No 
The Idolmaster SideM Live on Stage as Nao Okamura

2019
Fire Emblem: Three Houses as Ignatz
Hero's Park as Amase Shu
The Seven Deadly Sins: Grand Cross as Sariel

Television
Shitsuren Chocolatier (Fuji TV, 2014) 
Beauty and The Fellow (NHK G, 2015) as Candidato A
Iryū Sōsa (TV Asahi, 2015) 
Keishichō Nashigoren-ka (TV Asahi, 2016) as Ken'ichi Kurashiki

Dubbing
Shazam! (2021 THE CINEMA edition) (Burke Breyer (Evan Marsh))

References

External links 
 Official website 

1989 births
Living people
Japanese male video game actors
Japanese male voice actors
Male voice actors from Tokushima Prefecture